The 2012 New York State Senate elections were held on November 6, 2012 to elect representatives from all 63 State Senate districts in the U.S. state of New York. Primary elections were held on September 13, 2012.

Democrats won a total of 33 seats for a three-seat majority. Democrats gained seats in Senate Districts 17 (where Democrat Simcha Felder defeated Republican incumbent David Storobin), 41, and 55 (where Ted O'Brien defeated Sean Hanna to win the seat vacated by the retiring Republican Sen. Jim Alesi), and won the election in the newly-created Senate District 46. In Senate District 46, Republican George Amedore was named the winner and was sworn in as a senator. However, a recount revealed that Democrat Cecilia Tkaczyk had defeated Amedore by 18 votes; therefore, Amedore vacated the seat (becoming the shortest-tenured senator in modern New York history) and Tkaczyk was sworn in.

Of the four Republican state senators who voted for the Marriage Equality Act in 2011 (Sens. Roy McDonald, James Alesi, Mark Grisanti, and Stephen Saland), only Grisanti was re-elected in 2012.

On December 4, 2012, it was announced that Senate Republicans had reached a power-sharing deal with the four-member Independent Democratic Conference (IDC). Together, the Senate Republicans and the IDC held enough seats to form a governing majority. That majority was augmented when freshman Sen. Simcha Felder of Brooklyn, a Democrat, joined the Senate Republican Conference.

District 1

District 2

District 3

District 4

District 5

District 6

District 7

District 8

District 9

District 10

District 11

District 12

District 13

District 14

District 15

District 16

District 17

District 18

District 19

District 20

District 21

District 22

District 23

District 24

District 25

District 26

District 27

District 28

District 29

District 30

District 31

District 32

District 33

District 34

District 35

District 36

District 37

District 38

District 39

District 40

District 41

District 42

District 43

District 44

District 45

District 46

District 47

District 48

District 49

District 50

District 51

District 52

District 53

District 54

District 55

District 56

District 57

District 58

District 59

District 60

District 61

District 62

District 63

References

External links
 2012 New York State Senate Election Results

New York State Senate elections
2012 New York (state) elections
New York State Senate
Independent Democratic Conference